Kings River was a Yokutsan language of California.

Dialects
There were four dialects of Kings River, Chukaymina, Michahay, Ayitcha ( Kocheyali), and Choynimni.

See also
Yokutsan languages

External links
 Kings River Yokuts, California Language Archive
 Yokut tales

Yokutsan languages
Extinct languages of North America
Kings River (California)